

535001–535100 

|-bgcolor=#f2f2f2
| colspan=4 align=center | 
|}

535101–535200 

|-bgcolor=#f2f2f2
| colspan=4 align=center | 
|}

535201–535300 

|-bgcolor=#f2f2f2
| colspan=4 align=center | 
|}

535301–535400 

|-id=353
| 535353 Antoniwilk ||  ||  (1876–1940), a Polish astronomer, educator and discoverer of comets, who was awarded with the comet medal of the Astronomical Society of the Pacific and the Order of Polonia Restituta. || 
|}

535401–535500 

|-bgcolor=#f2f2f2
| colspan=4 align=center | 
|}

535501–535600 

|-bgcolor=#f2f2f2
| colspan=4 align=center | 
|}

535601–535700 

|-bgcolor=#f2f2f2
| colspan=4 align=center | 
|}

535701–535800 

|-bgcolor=#f2f2f2
| colspan=4 align=center | 
|}

535801–535900 

|-bgcolor=#f2f2f2
| colspan=4 align=center | 
|}

535901–536000 

|-bgcolor=#f2f2f2
| colspan=4 align=center | 
|}

References 

535001-536000